Chris Fowler (born 22 August 1948) is a former Australian rules footballer who played with Melbourne in the Victorian Football League (VFL).

Notes

External links 

1948 births
Living people
Australian rules footballers from Victoria (Australia)
Melbourne Football Club players